The 1936 Rice Owls football team was an American football team that represented Rice University as a member of the Southwest Conference (SWC) during the 1936 college football season. In its third season under head coach Jimmy Kitts, the team compiled a 5–7 record (1–5 against SWC opponents) and outscored opponents by a total of 127 to 108.

Schedule

References

Rice
Rice Owls football seasons
Rice Owls football